WRGM (1440 AM) is a radio station broadcasting a sports format.  Licensed to Ontario, Ohio, United States, the station serves the Mid-Ohio area.  The station is currently owned by Gsm Media Corporation and features programming from ESPN Radio, Motor Racing Network and Westwood One.

FM translator
WRGM's programming is simulcast 24 hours on FM translator W294CK, in order to widen the broadcast area of 1440 kHz, especially during nighttime hours when the AM broadcasts with only 28 watts.

On August 20, 2018 WRGM switched its FM translator from W247BL 97.3 FM (which switched to a country format, simulcasting WVNO-FMHD3) to W294CK 106.7 FM Mansfield.

Previous logo
 (WRGM's logo under previous 97.3 translator)

References

External links

FM translator

RGM